Pasanga is an Indian Tamil-language children's film directed by Pandiraj. It stars debutant child actors like Kishore DS, Sree Raam and Pandian, along with newcomer Vimal and Vega Tamotia in supporting roles. The film is produced by Sasikumar and music score is composed by James Vasanthan.They rose to fame after their 2008 hit film Subramaniyapuram . Pasanga was released on 1 May 2009 to critical acclaim, winning three National Film Awards and several other awards at international film festivals.

Plot
The story unfolds in a dry and barren village. The protagonist Anbukkarasu (Kishore) wants to excel in life as a collector and is a preceious child. He meets Jeevanandam (Sree Raam), the son of the school teacher Chokkulingam (Jayaprakash). The meeting occurs on the first day of school. In the long run, Jeeva develops an instant dislike for Anbu even the good-hearted Anbu tries to befriend him. However, Jeeva continues to hate Anbu with a passion. Enters Manonmani (Dharini), Jeeva's cousin, who develops an affinity towards Anbu. This makes Jeeva detest Anbu further. Anbu excels academically and in extracurricular activities, which contributes to widening the rift between the two. Anbu's parents have different opinions on life, resulting in a fight between them that Jeeva uses as a means to hurt Anbu further.

A fight between Anbu and Jeeva escalates to involve their parents, and this divides their families. The elders smooth out their differences when Jeeva's father speaks to Anbu's father about forgiveness, leading Anbu's father to get along better with his wife. In a twist, Meenakshi Sundaram (Vimal), Anbu's uncle, falls in love with Soppikannu (Vega Tamotia), Jeeva's sister. The families unite when they agree to the marriage of Meenakshi Sundaram and Soppikannu, much to the chagrin of Jeeva and Anbu, whose rift deepens.

At the end of their sixth grade, Jeeva's father asks the class to a write a letter about good and bad events in their past year, and this causes Anbu and Jeeva to share their feelings about one another. Anbu expresses his liking of Jeeva, while Jeeva continues to express his dislike of Anbu. However, Manonmani helps Jeeva understand that Anbu has changed his life for the better. When Anbu meets with a sudden accident, Jeeva's encouragement helps Anbu recover. Jeeva apologizes, they become friends, and the film ends with Meenakshi Sundaram's marriage to Soppikannu.

Cast

 Kishore DS as Anbukkarasu
 Sree Raam as Jeeva Nithyanandham
 Pandian as Kuzhanthaivelu (Pakkada)
 Vimal as Meenakshi Sundaram
 Vega Tamotia as Sobhikannu
 Dharani as Manonmani
 Murugesh  as Kuttimani
 Shri Krishna V N as Gautham Vellaichamy (Bujjima)
 Yoganathan as Akila
 Jayaprakash as Chokkalingam
 Sivakumar as Vellaichamy, Anbu's father (Voiced by Samuthirakani)
 Sujatha Sivakumar as Mrs. Chokkalingam
 Senthi Kumari as Pothumponnu Vellaichamy
 Rony David as  Mukeshmaanu

Production

Ramakrishnan was initially offered a lead role by Pandiraj, who was Ramakrishnan's colleague when they were assistants to director Cheran. As Ramakrishnan was busy with the shoot of Kunguma Poovum Konjum Puravum (2009), Vemal was cast in the role instead.

Accolades

57th National Film Awards  

 Best Child Artist - Kishore DS and Sree Raam
 Best Dialogues - Pandiraj
 Best Feature Film in Tamil

Tamil Nadu State Film Awards 

 Tamil Nadu State Film Award for Best Film

57th Filmfare Awards South 

 Best Supporting Actor - Jayaprakash

4th Vijay Awards 

 Best Supporting Actor - Jayaprakash
 Best Debut Actor - Vimal
 Best Find of the Year - Pandiraj
 Best Crew

Other awards 

 Anandha Vikatan Award for Best Director - Pandiraj
 Anandha Vikatan Award for Best Film
 Chennai International Film Festival for Second Best Feature Film
 International Children's Film Festival Golden Elephant Award for Best Director - Pandiraj
 Pondicherry Government Sankaradas Swamigal Award for Best Indian Film
 South Scope Cine Awards for Best Film
 World Malayali Council's Essar Award for Best Director - Pandiraj

International Film Festival 

 19th Golden Rooster And Hundred Flowers Film Festival  (Jiangyin,China)
 Chinese Festival Of India 2010 (China)
 6th International Children Film Festival 2010 (Bangalore, India)
 40th International Film Festival Of India 2009 (Goa) 
 2nd International Children Film Festival Bangladesh
 Pune International Children Film Festival
 Lucknow International Film Festival - Best Film (Nominee) and Best Director (Nominee)
 SILPIX Children's Film Festival in America, Chicago 2011
 Norway International Film Festival 2010
 Children's Film Festival, Singapore - 2011

Music

Music and soundtracks were composed by Subramaniyapuram composer James Vasanthan. The soundtrack features four songs, the lyrics for which are written by Thamarai, Yugabharathi and James Vasanthan himself.

Release
The satellite rights of the film were sold to Kalaignar TV.

Remake
The film was remade in Sri Lanka by Sinhala-language under the title Daruwane in 2012.

References

External links

2009 films
Films about the education system in India
2000s Tamil-language films
Films directed by Pandiraj
Films scored by James Vasanthan
Indian children's films
Child characters in film
Tamil films remade in other languages
Films whose writer won the Best Dialogue National Film Award
Best Tamil Feature Film National Film Award winners
2009 directorial debut films